World ski championships may refer to:
FIS Alpine World Ski Championships
IPC Alpine Skiing World Championships, Alpine, disability
FIS Freestyle World Ski Championships
FIS Nordic World Ski Championships
FIS Ski-Flying World Championships
FIS Snowboard World Championships